John Campbell (born 23 November 1988) is an English footballer who plays for Whitby Town. He is a striker.

Career
A Newcastle United youth graduate, Campbell was released by the club in 2002, aged 14, with Andy Carroll being the other option. He subsequently played for Manchester City's youth setup, and was released in 2006, aged 18.

Campbell subsequently played for non-league teams, and joined Conference Premier side Darlington on 31 January 2011, after scoring 25 goals in half a season at Newcastle Benfield. He also had trials at Swindon Town in December 2010.

Campbell left the Quakers on 8 November, and signed for Bedlington Terriers. In January 2012 he moved to West Auckland Town, scoring 42 goals in the 2012–13 season.

In the 2014 summer Campbell joined Jarrow Roofing. In October, after scoring 18 goals in 14 games, he attracted the interest of several Football League clubs.

On 27 November 2014 Campbell signed a short-term deal with League Two side Oxford United. He made his professional debut on 20 December, starting in a 1–1 away draw against Hartlepool United. Eight days later he scored his first professional goal, netting his side's first in a 2–1 away win over Plymouth Argyle.

On 17 February 2015 Campbell signed for Torquay United on loan from Oxford until the end of the season. Campbell made his first appearance as a substitute versus Wrexham in the semi-final first leg of the FA Trophy, which ended in a 2–1 defeat for Torquay, and his full debut in the second leg, which Torquay lost 3–0.

In September 2017 he joined Whitby Town.

Personal life
Campbell has three sons, Layton, Cory and Cassidy. The former is also a footballer, and has attracted the interest of Newcastle and Sunderland.

References

External links

1988 births
Living people
Footballers from Newcastle upon Tyne
English footballers
Association football forwards
West Allotment Celtic F.C. players
Newcastle Benfield F.C. players
Darlington F.C. players
Bedlington Terriers F.C. players
West Auckland Town F.C. players
Jarrow Roofing Boldon Community Association F.C. players
Oxford United F.C. players
Torquay United F.C. players
Newton Aycliffe F.C. players
National League (English football) players
English Football League players
Northern Football League players
Whitby Town F.C. players